The inferior phrenic arteries are two small vessels which supply the diaphragm. They present much variety in their origin.

Structure

Origin 
The inferior phrenic arteries usually arise between T12 and L2 vertebrae. They may arise separately from the front of the aorta, immediately above the celiac artery, or by a common trunk, which may spring either from the aorta or from the celiac artery. Sometimes one is derived from the aorta, and the other from one of the renal arteries; they rarely arise as separate vessels from the aorta.

Branches 
They diverge from one another across the crura of the diaphragm, and then run obliquely upward and lateralward upon its under surface.
 The left phrenic passes behind the esophagus, and runs forward on the left side of the esophageal hiatus.
 The right phrenic passes behind the inferior vena cava, and along the right side of the foramen which transmits that vein. Near the back part of the central tendon each vessel divides into a medial and a lateral branch.
 The medial branch curves forward, and anastomoses with its fellow of the opposite side, and with the musculophrenic and pericardiacophrenic arteries.
 The lateral branch passes toward the side of the thorax, and anastomoses with the lower intercostal arteries, and with the musculophrenic. The lateral branch of the right phrenic gives off a few vessels to the inferior vena cava; and the left one, some branches to the esophagus.

Function 
The inferior phrenic arteries supply the diaphragm. Each of the smaller vessels give off superior supradrenal branches to the supradrenal gland of its own side. The spleen and the liver also receive a few twigs from the left and right vessels respectively.

References

External links
  - "Posterior Abdominal Wall: Branches of the Abdominal Aorta"
  (#23)

Arteries of the abdomen